The Shell Building is an office tower in the  Financial District of San Francisco, California. The 28-story, building is located at 100 Bush Street, at Battery Street.  It was designed by George W. Kelham and built in 1929, in the architectural style of Gothic Moderne, Moderne and Art Deco.

Shell Oil Company occupied the building until the 1960s. There are castings of shells that decorate the cornice on the upper levels as well as shell designs in the lobby floor and decorative grill at the front of the building.

A renovation by Heller Manus Architects won the San Francisco Architectural Heritage Award in 1994.

See also
Eliel Saarinen's Tribune Tower design
List of tallest buildings in San Francisco

References

External links
 Shell Building website

Office buildings completed in 1929
Skyscraper office buildings in San Francisco
Shell plc buildings and structures
Art Deco architecture in California
Financial District, San Francisco